Eugene Fuller (8 May 1858 - 1930), was an American surgeon and pioneer of the procedure of suprapubic prostatectomy.

References

American surgeons
People from Massachusetts
1858 births
1930 deaths